Lady is a song co-written, co-produced and performed by American neo soul singer D'Angelo, issued as the third single from his debut studio album, Brown Sugar (1995). A remixed version of the song (titled the Clean Street Version) was also released, featuring vocals from American hip hop musician AZ. Separate music videos were created for both versions of the song.

"Lady" is D'Angelo's biggest hit single to date in the United States, peaking at #10 on the Billboard Hot 100 in 1996. It was certified gold by the RIAA on June 4, 1996. The song was also nominated for a Grammy Award for Best Male R&B Vocal Performance in 1997, but lost to "Your Secret Love" by Luther Vandross.

Canadian rapper Drake heavily sampled the song for the closing track "March 14" off of his 2018 album Scorpion.

Critical reception
Larry Flick from Billboard wrote, "As "Cruisin'" continues to attract popsters, D'Angelo—one of the most bold and interesting new artists in R&B—serves his core soul audience this sultry, percussive slow jam from his sterling album Brown Sugar. As with past singles, the emphasis here is on sharp musicianship and adventurous songwriting. D'Angelo's street Romeo vocal style is put to excellent use with this tune's simple, effective "you're my lady" refrain, as well as the limber bass/guitar interplay. After being heralded by R&B radio, this should prove to be D'Angelo's biggest pop hit so far." Ann Powers from Spin described it as "sexy-paranoid", saying that songs like "Lady" "get serious with soul's erotic undercurrents, reaching for the exquisite tension of early Prince and late Marvin Gaye."

Music videos
The official music video for the original version of the song was directed by Hype Williams. The video for the remix version was directed by Brett Ratner. In addition to AZ, the remix video features appearances from singers Faith Evans and Joi; as well as Erykah Badu in her first music video appearance.

Charts

Weekly charts

Year-end charts

References

External links
 
 

1995 songs
1996 singles
D'Angelo songs
AZ (rapper) songs
EMI Records singles
Music videos directed by Hype Williams
Music videos directed by Brett Ratner
Song recordings produced by D'Angelo
Song recordings produced by Raphael Saadiq
Songs written by D'Angelo
Songs written by Raphael Saadiq